Bill Cable (born William Laurence Cumpanas; May 2, 1946 – March 7, 1998) was an American actor, model, and stunt performer.

Biography
Cable was the grandchild of Thomas Ante and Katherine Pezo. In 1914 his grandfather left the village of Klenovac in Dalmatia, Croatia, and moved to Gary, Indiana. He became a member of the former Hrvatski Sinovi CFU Lodge 396 and would eventually serve as the lodge's president. After Cable's grandfather died in 1950, his family moved to California.

Cable was a standout football player for North Hollywood High School as an offensive tackle, and became a varsity captain in his senior year. He continued playing football after enrolling at the University of Nevada, but eventually stopped after a serious head injury. His other hobbies included motorcycles and guns.

He married Shirley Cumpanas in Nevada in 1985 and she had an affair with Christian Brando, son of actor Marlon Brando, which led to their divorce, according to an interview and essay with Shirley to Penthouse magazine. He and Cable remained friends. A few years earlier, they both interviewed by Skip E. Lowe on the Skip E. Lowe Globe.

In October 1996, Cable was involved in a motorcycle accident in Laurel Canyon in which he sustained a fractured vertebra in his neck, leaving him paralyzed from the chest down. Cable died of these injuries on March 7, 1998, at the age of 51. His funeral was attended by Cassandra Peterson and Paul Reubens. Cable was cremated. The William Laurence Cumpanas Fund was established after his death, supporting the Croatian Fraternal Union Lodge 170 in Merrillville, Indiana.

Model
From 1970, Cable was a model for COLT Studio Group, where he was photographed by Jim French. He was photographed by Bob Mizer for the Athletic Model Guild. Cable later posed for the book More Nudes, photographed by Kenn Duncan, whose collection was donated to the New York Public Library by Kenn Duncan's brother and sister in 2003. He was also photographed by Tommy Marshall, Ray Allen, Robert Scott Hooper, Dave Sands, Jeff Dunas and for Playgirl by David Meyer, Raul Vega and Mr. Blackwell. Pornographic pictures of Cable having sex with women were published in Hollywood Hotline, Star Nudes, and Hollywood Rated X in the 1970s.

Photos of him have been published in many magazines and catalogues, such as: Vanity Fair, Playgirl, Playboy, Oui, Ah Men catalog, That Look! catalog, Frederick's of Hollywood catalog, QQ Magazine, After Dark, California Scene, Honcho, The Best of Gallery, Manpower!, David, In Touch, Blueboy, Barfly, Groovy Guy, Vector, Celebrity Sleuth, H.E.L.P. Drummer, Drummer, Body, Q International, Entertainment West, Hit & Fun, Scream Queens, Playgirl Advisor, Torso, Olympus (first edition in January 1972) and Mandate (first edition in April 1975).Actor
Cable acted in mainstream films, including gay and straight erotic films, as a film stuntman and for TV productions. His first cinematic movie, Bijou (1972), was directed by Wakefield Poole. Cable starred in the short erotic gay film Cooling It in 1973.

Cable's most famous role in mainstream film was the rock star Johnny Boz, who is murdered with an ice pick in the opening scene of the suspense film Basic Instinct.

He worked on Elvira's Movie Macabre in 1984 (Episode: Frankenstein's Castle of Freaks). Cable also appeared in the films Pee-wee's Big Adventure, Elvira, Mistress of the Dark, La Posta in Gioco, The Deadly Cure and in 4 films with director Carlos Tobalina (filmmaker): The Last Tango in Acapulco, Jungle Blue, Flesh and Bullets and What's Love''.

Filmography

References

Citations

External links
 
 

1946 births
1998 deaths
American actors in gay pornographic films
Male pornographic film actors
American male film actors
20th-century American male actors
Male actors from Indiana
People from Gary, Indiana
Road incident deaths in California
American people of Croatian descent
North Hollywood High School alumni